Pensacola Christian Academy (PCA) is a private Christian school serving elementary through high school grades. It is located in Pensacola, Florida, United States.

History
The school was founded as Pensacola Christian School in 1954 by Arlin Horton (who later established Pensacola Christian College) and his wife Beka. PCS began in a three classroom building, offering only three classes from kindergarten through second grade. One grade was added each year until the school reached 9th grade. In the early days PCS was one of the only schools with air-conditioned class rooms. Grades ten through twelve were added after the school was moved to a larger facility in the mid 1960s.

In 1994 PCS completed a new state-of-the-art facility located on Brent Lane in Pensacola. Following the move to the new facility Pensacola Christian School changed its name to Pensacola Christian Academy.

Program
PCA is an evangelical Christian school using Abeka curriculum. The school is accredited through the Florida Association of Christian Colleges and Schools, an accrediting body for Christian schools. Since its inception the school has remained dedicated to using "traditional methods" such as phonics for teaching reading and the art of cursive for penmanship. Although criticized by some, PCA begins teaching cursive form of writing as early as kindergarten. PCA believes that forming a firm foundation for the very basic skills is important for learning more advanced skills later in education and later in life.

Dress Code and Regulation

Girls are only allowed to wear skirts or dresses that do not rise above their knees (7-12th only) and shirts that do not show their stomach. Boys can wear pants. Boys cannot wear shorts (7th-12th only). For girls most jewelry is permitted. Cartilage/facial/tongue/lip/eyebrow/belly button piercings are not permitted. No words are allowed on the clothing, unless they are able to be covered by one or two fingers.

Associations

Pensacola Christian Academy is associated with Pensacola Christian College, and is utilized extensively by the PCC Education Department as a training grounds in all PCC Education Majors. All PCC Education internships as well as many classroom observation practicums are held within the PCA facility.

The A Beka Books curriculum which is marketed to home schoolers and private Christian schools throughout the world is named for the co-founder of the Pensacola Christian Academy, Beka Horton. The curriculum was developed within PCA and is the curriculum used solely by the school. A Beka Books textbooks are written from a conservative Christian perspective and are available to home schoolers and Christian schools for purchase through the A Beka Books website.

In addition to A Beka Books, PCA also is affiliated with A Beka Academy, a correspondence school system that uses the A Beka Books curriculum. The A Beka Academy features DVDs of PCA teachers recorded while teaching live classes at PCA. All student test scores and grades for those enrolled in A Beka Academy are sent to and recorded at the A Beka Academy offices. On completion of the 12th grade, a home-schooled student of A Beka Academy may graduate.

Notable alumni

See also
Pensacola Christian College

References

External links
Pensacola Christian Academy website

Christian schools in Florida
Buildings and structures in Pensacola, Florida
Private high schools in Florida
Private elementary schools in Florida
High schools in Escambia County, Florida
Private middle schools in Florida
Educational institutions established in 1954
1954 establishments in Florida